Jay Julian Miller (July 19, 1943 – April 5, 2001) was an American forward in the National Basketball Association. Miller first played for the St. Louis Hawks before being selected by the Milwaukee Bucks in the 1968 NBA Expansion Draft. After his time with the Bucks, he spent the rest of his career in the American Basketball Association.

References

1943 births
2001 deaths
American men's basketball players
Basketball players at the 1967 Pan American Games
Basketball players from St. Louis
Indiana Pacers players
Los Angeles Stars players
Milwaukee Bucks expansion draft picks
Milwaukee Bucks players
Notre Dame Fighting Irish men's basketball players
Small forwards
St. Louis Hawks players
Undrafted National Basketball Association players
United States men's national basketball team players
Pan American Games competitors for the United States
1967 FIBA World Championship players